William Balcombe (28 December 1777  – 19 March 1829) was an East India Company and colonial administrator. He came to fame as the father of a daughter (Betsy Balcombe) who befriended Napoleon Bonaparte whilst the Balcombe family were living on Saint Helena. The exiled Bonaparte had lodged with the Balcombes (at the Briars) whilst his permanent quarters at Longwood were being prepared.

William Balcombe spent some time in the Colony of New South Wales appointed as the first treasurer, arriving on 5 April 1824 with his family and servants aboard the Hibernia. He died there in 1829 (aged 51) and was buried in Sydney.

Gallery

References

Further reading
 

1777 births
1829 deaths
Saint Helenian people of European descent
Public servants of New South Wales
English emigrants to Australia
Treasurers of New South Wales
People from Brighton and Hove